Jim Reeves—and Some Friends is a studio album by Jim Reeves, released posthumously in 1969 on RCA Victor. It was produced by Chet Atkins and Danny Davis.

Track listing

Charts

References 

1969 albums
Jim Reeves albums
RCA Victor albums
Albums produced by Chet Atkins
Albums produced by Danny Davis (country musician)